Madison Place is a one-block street located in northwest Washington, D.C., across from the White House. It forms the eastern border of Lafayette Square (the northernmost part of President's Park) between Pennsylvania Avenue and H Street NW. Buildings on Madison Place include the Howard T. Markey National Courts Building, the Benjamin Ogle Tayloe House, the Cutts-Madison House, and the Freedman's Bank Building. The street is part of the Lafayette Square Historic District.

References

External links
 

Streets in Washington, D.C.